Guy Casaril (1933-1996) was a French film director, screenwriter and non-fiction writer. His first film, L'Astragale, was a cinematic adaptation of an eponymous novel by Albertine Sarrazin. His biopic about Edith Piaf was lauded by The Catholic Advance out of Wichita, Kansas for "evoking the mood's period and background".

Filmography

Works

References

External links

1933 births
1996 deaths
People from Lot-et-Garonne
French film directors
20th-century French screenwriters
French non-fiction writers
20th-century non-fiction writers